Utah is a landlocked state in the Mountain West subregion of the Western United States. It is bordered to its east by Colorado, to its northeast by Wyoming, to its north by Idaho, to its south by Arizona, and to its west by Nevada. Utah also touches a corner of New Mexico in the southeast. Of the fifty U.S. states, Utah is the 13th-largest by area; with a population over three million, it is the 30th-most-populous and 11th-least-densely populated. Urban development is mostly concentrated in two areas: the Wasatch Front in the north-central part of the state, which is home to roughly two-thirds of the population and includes the capital city, Salt Lake City; and Washington County in the southwest, with more than 180,000 residents. Most of the western half of Utah lies in the Great Basin.

Utah has been inhabited for thousands of years by various indigenous groups such as the ancient Puebloans, Navajo and Ute. The Spanish were the first Europeans to arrive in the mid-16th century, though the region's difficult geography and harsh climate made it a peripheral part of New Spain and later Mexico. Even while it was Mexican territory, many of Utah's earliest settlers were American, particularly Mormons fleeing marginalization and persecution from the United States. Following the Mexican–American War in 1848, the region was annexed by the U.S., becoming part of the Utah Territory, which included what is now Colorado and Nevada. Disputes between the dominant Mormon community and the federal government delayed Utah's admission as a state; only after the outlawing of polygamy was it admitted in 1896 as the 45th.

People from Utah are known as Utahns. Slightly over half of all Utahns are Mormons, the vast majority of whom are members of the Church of Jesus Christ of Latter-day Saints (LDS Church), which has its world headquarters in Salt Lake City; Utah is the only state where a majority of the population belongs to a single church. The LDS Church greatly influences Utahn culture, politics, and daily life, though since the 1990s the state has become more religiously diverse as well as secular.

Utah has a highly diversified economy, with major sectors including transportation, education, information technology and research, government services, mining, and tourism. Utah has been one of the fastest growing states since 2000, with the 2020 U.S. census confirming the fastest population growth in the nation since 2010. St. George was the fastest-growing metropolitan area in the United States from 2000 to 2005. Utah ranks among the overall best states in metrics such as healthcare, governance, education, and infrastructure. It has the 14th-highest median average income and the least income inequality of any U.S. state. Over time and influenced by climate change, droughts in Utah have been increasing in frequency and severity, putting a further strain on Utah's water security and impacting the state’s economy.

Etymology
The name Utah is said to derive from the name of the Ute tribe, meaning 'people of the mountains'. The meaning of Utes as 'the mountain people' has been attributed to the neighboring Pueblo Indians, as well as to the Apache word , which means 'one that is higher up' or 'those that are higher up'. In Spanish, it was pronounced ; subsequently, English-speaking people may have adapted the word as Utah.

History

Pre-Columbian

Thousands of years before the arrival of European explorers, the Ancestral Puebloans and the Fremont people lived in what is now known as Utah, some of which spoke languages of the Uto-Aztecan group. Ancestral Pueblo peoples built their homes through excavations in mountains, and the Fremont people built houses of straw before disappearing from the region around the 15th century.

Another group of Native Americans, the Navajo, settled in the region around the 18th century. In the mid-18th century, other Uto-Aztecan tribes, including the Goshute, the Paiute, the Shoshone, and the Ute people, also settled in the region. These five groups were present when the first European explorers arrived.

Spanish exploration (1540)

The southern Utah region was explored by the Spanish in 1540, led by Francisco Vázquez de Coronado, while looking for the legendary Cíbola. A group led by two Catholic priests—sometimes called the Domínguez–Escalante expedition—left Santa Fe in 1776, hoping to find a route to the coast of California. The expedition traveled as far north as Utah Lake and encountered the native residents. The Spanish made further explorations in the region but were not interested in colonizing the area because of its desert nature. In 1821, the year Mexico achieved its independence from Spain, the region became known as part of its territory of Alta California.

European trappers and fur traders explored some areas of Utah in the early 19th century from Canada and the United States. The city of Provo, Utah, was named for one Étienne Provost, who visited the area in 1825. The city of Ogden, Utah, was named after Peter Skene Ogden, a Canadian explorer who traded furs in the Weber Valley.

In late 1824, Jim Bridger became the first known English-speaking person to sight the Great Salt Lake. Due to the high salinity of its waters, he thought he had found the Pacific Ocean; he subsequently learned this body of water was a giant salt lake. After the discovery of the lake, hundreds of American and Canadian traders and trappers established trading posts in the region. In the 1830s, thousands of migrants traveling from the Eastern United States to the American West began to make stops in the region of the Great Salt Lake, then known as Lake Youta.

Latter Day Saint settlement (1847)

Following the death of Joseph Smith in 1844, Brigham Young, as president of the Quorum of the Twelve, became the leader of the LDS Church in Nauvoo, Illinois. To address the growing conflicts between his people and their neighbors, Young agreed with Illinois Governor Thomas Ford in October 1845 that the Mormons would leave by the following year.

Young and the first group of Mormon pioneers reached the Salt Lake Valley on July 24, 1847. Over the next 22 years, more than 70,000 pioneers crossed the plains and settled in Utah. For the first few years, Brigham Young and the thousands of early settlers of Salt Lake City struggled to survive. The arid desert land was deemed by the Mormons as desirable as a place where they could practice their religion without harassment.

Settlers buried thirty-six Native Americans in one grave after an outbreak of measles occurred during the winter of 1847.

The first group of settlers brought African slaves with them, making Utah the only place in the western United States to have African slavery. Three slaves, Green Flake, Hark Lay, and Oscar Crosby, came west with the first group of settlers in 1847. The settlers also began to purchase Indian slaves in the well-established Indian slave trade, as well as enslaving Indian prisoners of war.

Utah was Mexican territory when the first pioneers arrived in 1847. Early in the Mexican–American War in late 1846, the United States had taken control of New Mexico and California. The entire Southwest became U.S. territory upon the signing of the Treaty of Guadalupe Hidalgo, February 2, 1848. The treaty was ratified by the United States Senate on March 11. Learning that California and New Mexico were applying for statehood, the settlers of the Utah area (originally having planned to petition for territorial status) applied for statehood with an ambitious plan for a State of Deseret.

The Mormon settlements provided pioneers for other settlements in the West. Salt Lake City became the hub of a "far-flung commonwealth" of Mormon settlements. With new church converts coming from the East and around the world, Church leaders often assigned groups of church members as missionaries to establish other settlements throughout the West. They developed irrigation to support fairly large pioneer populations along Utah's Wasatch front (Salt Lake City, Bountiful and Weber Valley, and Provo and Utah Valley). Throughout the remainder of the 19th century, Mormon pioneers established hundreds of other settlements in Utah, Idaho, Nevada, Arizona, Wyoming, California, Canada, and Mexico—including in Las Vegas, Nevada; Franklin, Idaho (the first European settlement in Idaho); San Bernardino, California; Mesa, Arizona; Star Valley, Wyoming; and Carson Valley, Nevada.

Prominent settlements in Utah included St. George, Logan, and Manti (where settlers completed the LDS Church's first three temples in Utah, each started after but finished many years before the larger and better known temple built in Salt Lake City was completed in 1893), as well as Parowan, Cedar City, Bluff, Moab, Vernal, Fillmore (which served as the territorial capital between 1850 and 1856), Nephi, Levan, Spanish Fork, Springville, Provo Bench (now Orem), Pleasant Grove, American Fork, Lehi, Sandy, Murray, Jordan, Centerville, Farmington, Huntsville, Kaysville, Grantsville, Tooele, Roy, Brigham City, and many other smaller towns and settlements. Young had an expansionist's view of the territory that he and the Mormon pioneers were settling, calling it Deseret—which according to the Book of Mormon was an ancient word for "honeybee". This is symbolized by the beehive on the Utah flag, and the state's motto, "Industry".

Utah Territory (1850–1896)

The Utah Territory was much smaller than the proposed state of Deseret, but it still contained all of the present states of Nevada and Utah as well as pieces of modern Wyoming and Colorado. It was created with the Compromise of 1850, and Fillmore, named after President Millard Fillmore, was designated the capital. The territory was given the name Utah after the Ute tribe of Native Americans. Salt Lake City replaced Fillmore as the territorial capital in 1856.

By 1850, there were around 100 black people in the territory, the majority of whom were slaves. In Salt Lake County, 26 slaves were counted. In 1852, the territorial legislature passed the Act in Relation to Service and the Act for the relief of Indian Slaves and Prisoners formally legalizing slavery in the territory. Slavery was abolished in the territory during the Civil War.

In 1850, Salt Lake City sent out a force known as the Nauvoo Legion and engaged the Timpanogos in the Battle at Fort Utah.

Disputes between the Mormon inhabitants and the U.S. government intensified due to the practice of plural marriage, or polygamy, among members of the LDS Church. The Mormons were still pushing for the establishment of a State of Deseret with the new borders of the Utah Territory. Most, if not all, of the members of the U.S. government opposed the polygamous practices of the Mormons.

Members of the LDS Church were viewed as un-American and rebellious when news of their polygamous practices spread. In 1857, particularly heinous accusations of abdication of government and general immorality were leveled by former associate justice William W. Drummond, among others. The detailed reports of life in Utah caused the administration of James Buchanan to send a secret military "expedition" to Utah. When the supposed rebellion should be quelled, Alfred Cumming would take the place of Brigham Young as territorial governor. The resulting conflict is known as the Utah War, nicknamed "Buchanan's Blunder" by the Mormon leaders.

In September 1857, about 120 American settlers of the Baker–Fancher wagon train, en route to California from Arkansas, were murdered by Utah Territorial Militia and some Paiute Native Americans in the Mountain Meadows massacre.

Before troops led by Albert Sidney Johnston entered the territory, Brigham Young ordered all residents of Salt Lake City to evacuate southward to Utah Valley and sent out the Nauvoo Legion to delay the government's advance. Although wagons and supplies were burned, eventually the troops arrived in 1858, and Young surrendered official control to Cumming, although most subsequent commentators claim that Young retained true power in the territory. A steady stream of governors appointed by the president quit the position, often citing the traditions of their supposed territorial government.

Salt Lake City was the last link of the First Transcontinental Telegraph, completed in October 1861. Brigham Young was among the first to send a message, along with Abraham Lincoln and other officials.

Because of the American Civil War, federal troops were pulled out of Utah Territory in 1861. This was a boon to the local economy as the army sold everything in camp for pennies on the dollar before marching back east to join the war. The territory was then left in LDS hands until Patrick E. Connor arrived with a regiment of California volunteers in 1862. Minerals were discovered in Tooele County and miners began to flock to the territory.

Beginning in 1865, Utah's Black Hawk War developed into the deadliest conflict in the territory's history. Chief Antonga Black Hawk died in 1870, but fights continued to break out until additional federal troops were sent in to suppress the Ghost Dance of 1872. The war is unique among Indian Wars because it was a three-way conflict, with mounted Timpanogos Utes led by Antonga Black Hawk fighting federal and LDS authorities.

On May 10, 1869, the First transcontinental railroad was completed at Promontory Summit, north of the Great Salt Lake. The railroad brought increasing numbers of people into the territory and several influential businesspeople made fortunes there.

During the 1870s and 1880s laws were passed to punish polygamists due, in part, to stories from Utah. Notably, Ann Eliza Young—tenth wife to divorce Brigham Young, women's advocate, national lecturer and author of Wife No.19 or My Life of Bondage and Mr. and Mrs. Fanny Stenhouse, authors of The Rocky Mountain Saints (T. B. H. Stenhouse, 1873) and Tell It All: My Life in Mormonism (Fanny Stenhouse, 1875). Both Ann Eliza and Fanny testify to the happiness of the very early Church members before polygamy. They independently published their books in 1875. These books and the lectures of Ann Eliza Young have been credited with the United States Congress passage of anti-polygamy laws by newspapers throughout the United States as recorded in "The Ann Eliza Young Vindicator", a pamphlet which detailed Ms Young's travels and warm reception throughout her lecture tour.

T. B. H. Stenhouse, former Utah Mormon polygamist, Mormon missionary for thirteen years and a Salt Lake City newspaper owner, finally left Utah and wrote The Rocky Mountain Saints. His book gives a witnessed account of life in Utah, both the good and the bad. He finally left Utah and Mormonism after financial ruin occurred when Brigham Young sent Stenhouse to relocate to Ogden, Utah, according to Stenhouse, to take over his thriving pro-Mormon Salt Lake Telegraph newspaper. In addition to these testimonies, The Confessions of John D. Lee, written by John D. Lee—alleged "Scape goat" for the Mountain Meadow Massacre—also came out in 1877. The corroborative testimonies coming out of Utah from Mormons and former Mormons influenced Congress and the people of the United States.

In the 1890 Manifesto, the LDS Church banned polygamy. When Utah applied for statehood again, it was accepted. One of the conditions for granting Utah statehood was that a ban on polygamy be written into the state constitution. This was a condition required of other western states that were admitted into the Union later. Statehood was officially granted on January 4, 1896.

20th century to present

Beginning in the early 20th century, with the establishment of such national parks as Bryce Canyon National Park and Zion National Park, Utah became known for its natural beauty. Southern Utah became a popular filming spot for arid, rugged scenes featured in the popular mid-century western film genre. From such films, most US residents recognize such natural landmarks as Delicate Arch and "the Mittens" of Monument Valley. During the 1950s, 1960s, and 1970s, with the construction of the Interstate highway system, accessibility to the southern scenic areas was made easier.

Since the establishment of Alta Ski Area in 1939 and the subsequent development of several ski resorts in the state's mountains, Utah's skiing has become world-renowned. The dry, powdery snow of the Wasatch Range is considered some of the best skiing in the world (the state license plate once claimed "the Greatest Snow on Earth"). Salt Lake City won the bid for the 2002 Winter Olympic Games, and this served as a great boost to the economy. The ski resorts have increased in popularity, and many of the Olympic venues built along the Wasatch Front continue to be used for sporting events. Preparation for the Olympics spurred the development of the light-rail system in the Salt Lake Valley, known as TRAX, and the re-construction of the freeway system around the city.

In 1957, Utah created the Utah State Parks Commission with four parks. Utah's state parks are scattered throughout Utah, from Bear Lake State Park at the Utah/Idaho border to Edge of the Cedars State Park Museum deep in the Four Corners region and everywhere in between. Utah State Parks is also home to the state's off highway vehicle office, state boating office and the trails program.

During the late 20th century, the state grew quickly. In the 1970s growth was phenomenal in the suburbs of the Wasatch Front. Sandy was one of the fastest-growing cities in the country at that time. Today, many areas of Utah continue to see boom-time growth. Northern Davis, southern and western Salt Lake, Summit, eastern Tooele, Utah, Wasatch, and Washington counties are all growing very quickly. Management of transportation and urbanization are major issues in politics, as development consumes agricultural land and wilderness areas and transportation is a major reason for poor air quality in Utah.

Geography and geology

Utah is known for its natural diversity and is home to features ranging from arid deserts with sand dunes to thriving pine forests in mountain valleys. It is a rugged and geographically diverse state at the convergence of three distinct geological regions: the Rocky Mountains, the Great Basin, and the Colorado Plateau.

It is one of the Four Corners states and is bordered by Idaho in the north, Wyoming in the north and east, by Colorado in the east, at a single point by New Mexico to the southeast, by Arizona in the south, and by Nevada in the west. Only three U.S. states (Utah, Colorado, and Wyoming) have exclusively latitude and longitude lines as boundaries.

One of Utah's defining characteristics is the variety of its terrain. Utah is home to world-renowned ski resorts made popular by light, fluffy snow and winter storms that regularly dump up to three feet of it overnight.

At the western base of the Wasatch Range is the Wasatch Front, a series of valleys and basins that are home to the most populous parts of the state. It stretches approximately from Brigham City at the north end to Nephi at the south end. Approximately 75 percent of the state's population lives in this corridor, and population growth is rapid.

Western Utah is mostly arid desert with a basin and range topography. Small mountain ranges and rugged terrain punctuate the landscape. The Bonneville Salt Flats are an exception, being comparatively flat as a result of once forming the bed of ancient Lake Bonneville. Great Salt Lake, Utah Lake, Sevier Lake, and Rush Lake are all remnants of this ancient freshwater lake, which once covered most of the eastern Great Basin. West of the Great Salt Lake, stretching to the Nevada border, lies the arid Great Salt Lake Desert. One exception to this aridity is Snake Valley, which is (relatively) lush due to large springs and wetlands fed from groundwater derived from snow melt in the Snake Range, Deep Creek Range, and other tall mountains to the west of Snake Valley. Great Basin National Park is just over the Nevada state line in the southern Snake Range. One of western Utah's most impressive, but least visited attractions is Notch Peak, the tallest limestone cliff in North America, located west of Delta.

Much of the scenic southern and southeastern landscape (specifically the Colorado Plateau region) is sandstone, specifically Kayenta sandstone and Navajo sandstone. The Colorado River and its tributaries wind their way through the sandstone, creating some of the world's most striking and wild terrain (the area around the confluence of the Colorado and Green Rivers was the last to be mapped in the lower 48 United States). Wind and rain have also sculpted the soft sandstone over millions of years. Canyons, gullies, arches, pinnacles, buttes, bluffs, and mesas are the common sights throughout south-central and southeast Utah.

This terrain is the central feature of protected state and federal parks such as Arches, Bryce Canyon, Canyonlands, Capitol Reef, and Zion national parks, Cedar Breaks, Grand Staircase–Escalante, Hovenweep, and Natural Bridges national monuments, Glen Canyon National Recreation Area (site of the popular tourist destination, Lake Powell), Dead Horse Point and Goblin Valley state parks, and Monument Valley. The Navajo Nation also extends into southeastern Utah. Southeastern Utah is also punctuated by the remote, but lofty La Sal, Abajo, and Henry mountain ranges.

Eastern (northern quarter) Utah is a high-elevation area covered mostly by plateaus and basins, particularly the Tavaputs Plateau and San Rafael Swell, which remain mostly inaccessible, and the Uinta Basin, where the majority of eastern Utah's population lives. Economies are dominated by mining, oil shale, oil, and natural gas-drilling, ranching, and recreation. Much of eastern Utah is part of the Uintah and Ouray Indian Reservation. The most popular destination within northeastern Utah is Dinosaur National Monument near Vernal.

Southwestern Utah is the lowest and hottest spot in Utah. It is known as Utah's Dixie because early settlers were able to grow some cotton there. The northernmost portion of the Mojave Desert is also located in this area. Dixie is quickly becoming a popular recreational and retirement destination, and the population is growing rapidly. Although the Wasatch Mountains end at Mount Nebo near Nephi, a complex series of mountain ranges extends south from the southern end of the range down the spine of Utah. Just north of Dixie and east of Cedar City is the state's highest ski resort, Brian Head.

Like most of the western and southwestern states, the federal government owns much of the land in Utah. Over 70 percent of the land is either BLM land, Utah State Trustland, or U.S. National Forest, U.S. National Park, U.S. National Monument, National Recreation Area or U.S. Wilderness Area. Utah is the only state where every county contains some national forest.

Adjacent states

Idaho (north)
Wyoming (east and north)
Colorado (east)
Nevada (west)
Arizona (south)

Climate

Utah features a dry, semi-arid to desert climate, although its many mountains feature a large variety of climates, with the highest points in the Uinta Mountains being above the timberline. The dry weather is a result of the state's location in the rain shadow of the Sierra Nevada in California. The eastern half of the state lies in the rain shadow of the Wasatch Mountains. The primary source of precipitation for the state is the Pacific Ocean, with the state usually lying in the path of large Pacific storms from October to May. In summer, the state, especially southern and eastern Utah, lies in the path of monsoon moisture from the Gulf of California.

Snowfall is common in all but the far southern valleys.

This micro climate of enhanced snowfall from the Great Salt Lake spans the entire proximity of the lake. The cottonwood canyons adjacent to Salt Lake City are located in the right position to receive more precipitation from the lake. The consistently deep powder snow led Utah's ski industry to adopt the slogan "the Greatest Snow on Earth" in the 1980s. In the winter, temperature inversions are a common phenomenon across Utah's low basins and valleys, leading to thick haze and fog that can last for weeks at a time, especially in the Uintah Basin. Although at other times of year its air quality is good, winter inversions give Salt Lake City some of the worst wintertime pollution in the country.

Previous studies have indicated a widespread decline in snowpack over Utah accompanied by a decline in the snow–precipitation ratio while anecdotal evidence claims have been put forward that measured changes in Utah's snowpack are spurious and do not reflect actual change. A 2012 study found that the proportion of winter (January–March) precipitation falling as snow has decreased by nine percent during the last half century, a combined result from a significant increase in rainfall and a minor decrease in snowfall. Meanwhile, observed snow depth across Utah has decreased and is accompanied by consistent decreases in snow cover and surface albedo. Weather systems with the potential to produce precipitation in Utah have decreased in number with those producing snowfall decreasing at a considerably greater rate.

Utah's temperatures are extreme, with cold temperatures in winter due to its elevation, and very hot summers statewide (with the exception of mountain areas and high mountain valleys). Utah is usually protected from major blasts of cold air by mountains lying north and east of the state, although major Arctic blasts can occasionally reach the state.

Temperatures dropping below  should be expected on occasion in most areas of the state most years, although some areas see it often (for example, the town of Randolph averages about fifty days per year with temperatures that low). However, the low humidity and high elevation typically leads to large temperature variations, leading to cool nights most summer days.

Utah, like most of the western United States, has few days of thunderstorms. On average there are fewer than 40 days of thunderstorm activity during the year, although these storms can be briefly intense when they do occur. They are most likely to occur during monsoon season from about mid-July through mid-September, especially in southern and eastern Utah. Dry lightning strikes and the general dry weather often spark wildfires in summer, while intense thunderstorms can lead to flash flooding, especially in the rugged terrain of southern Utah. Although spring is the wettest season in northern Utah, late summer is the wettest period for much of the south and east of the state. Tornadoes are uncommon in Utah, with an average of two striking the state yearly, rarely higher than EF1 intensity.

One exception of note, however, was the unprecedented Salt Lake City Tornado that moved directly across downtown Salt Lake City on August 11, 1999. The F2 tornado killed one person, injured sixty others, and caused approximately $170 million in damage; it was the second strongest tornado in the state behind an F3 on August 11, 1993, in the Uinta Mountains. The only other reported tornado fatality in Utah's history was a 7-year-old girl who was killed while camping in Summit County on July 6, 1884. The last tornado of above (E)F0 intensity occurred on September 8, 2002, when an F2 tornado hit Manti.

Wildlife

Utah is home to more than 600 vertebrate animals as well as numerous invertebrates and insects.

Mammals

Mammals are found in every area of Utah. Non-predatory larger mammals include the plains bison, elk, moose, mountain goat, mule deer, pronghorn, and multiple types of bighorn sheep. Non-predatory small mammals include muskrat, and nutria. Large and small predatory mammals include the black bear, cougar, Canada lynx, bobcat, fox (gray, red, and kit), coyote, badger, black-footed ferret, mink, stoat, long-tailed weasel, raccoon, and otter.

The brown bear was formerly found within Utah, but has been extirpated. There are no confirmed mating pairs of gray wolf in Utah, though there have been sightings in northeastern Utah along the Wyoming border.

Birds

As of January 2020, there were 466 species included in the official list managed by the Utah Bird Records Committee (UBRC). Of these, 119 are classed as accidental, 29 are classed as occasional, 57 are classed as rare, and 10 have been introduced to Utah or North America. Eleven of the accidental species are also classed as provisional.

Due to the miracle of the gulls incident in 1848, the most well known bird in Utah is the California gull, which is the Utah state bird. A monument in Salt Lake City commemorates this event, known as the "Miracle of the Gulls". Other gulls common to Utah include Bonaparte's gull, the ring-billed gull, and Franklin's gull.

Other birds commonly found include the American robin, the common starling, finches (black rosy, Cassin's, and goldfinch), the black-billed magpie, mourning doves, sparrows (house, tree, black-chinned, black-throated, Brewer's, and chipping), Clark's grebe, the ferruginous hawk, geese (snow, cackling, and Canada), eagles (golden and bald), California quail, mountain bluebird, and hummingbirds (calliope, black-chinned, and broad-tailed).

Invertebrates

Utah is host to a wide variety of arachnids, insects, mollusks, and other invertebrates. Arachnids include the Arizona bark scorpion, Western black widow spiders, crab spiders, hobo spiders (Tegenaria agrestis), cellar spiders, American grass spiders, woodlouse spiders. Several spiders found in Utah are often mistaken for the brown recluse spider, including the desert recluse spider (found only in Washington County), the cellar spider, and crevice weaving spiders.  The brown recluse spider has not been officially confirmed in Utah .

One of the most rare insects in Utah is the Coral Pink Sand Dunes tiger beetle, found only in Coral Pink Sand Dunes State Park, near Kanab. It was proposed in 2012 to be listed as a threatened species, but the proposal was not accepted. Other insects include grasshoppers, green stink bugs, the Army cutworm, the monarch butterfly, and Mormon fritillary butterfly. The white-lined sphinx moth is common to most of the United States, but there have been reported outbreaks of large groups of their larvae damaging tomato, grape and garden crops in Utah. Four or five species of firefly are also found across the state.

In February 2009, Africanized honeybees were found in southern Utah. The bees had spread into eight counties in Utah, as far north as Grand and Emery counties by May 2017.

Vegetation

Several thousand plants are native to Utah, including a variety of trees, shrubs, cacti, herbaceous plants, and grasses. , there are 3,930 species of plants in Utah, with 3,128 of those being indigenous and 792 being introduced through various means.

Common trees include pines/piñons (white fir, Colorado, single-leaf, Great Basin bristlecone, ponderosa, Engelmann spruce, Rocky Mountain white), and Acer grandidentatum, quaking aspen, bigtooth maple, Utah juniper, speckled alder, red birch, Gambel oak, desert willow, blue spruce, and Joshua trees. Utah has a number of named trees, including the Jardine Juniper, Pando, and the Thousand Mile Tree. Shrubs include a number of different ephedras (pitamoreal, Navajo, Arizona, Nevada, Torrey's jointfir, and green Mormon tea), sagebrushes (little, Bigelow, silver, Michaux's wormwood, black, pygmy, bud, and Great Basin), blue elderberry, Utah serviceberry, chokecherry, and skunkbush sumac. Western poison oak, poison sumac, and western poison ivy are all found in Utah.

There are many varieties of cacti in Utah's varied deserts, especially in the southern and western parts of the state. Some of these include desert prickly pear, California barrel cactus, fishhook cactus, cholla, beavertail prickly pear, and Uinta Basin hookless cactus. Despite the desert climate, many different grasses are found in Utah, including Mormon needlegrass, bluebunch wheatgrass, western alkali grass, squirreltail, desert saltgrass, and cheatgrass.

Several invasive species of plants are considered noxious weeds by the state, including Bermuda grass, field bindweed, henbane, jointed goatgrass, Canada thistle, Balkan and common toadflax, giant cane, couch grass, St. John's wort, hemlock, sword grass, Russian olive, myrtle spurge, Japanese knotweed, salt cedar, and goat's head.

Demographics

At the 2020 U.S. census, Utah had a population of 3,271,616. The U.S. Census Bureau estimated that the population of Utah was 3,205,958 on July 1, 2019, a 16.00% increase since the 2010 U.S. census. The center of population of Utah is located in Utah County in the city of Lehi. Much of the population lives in cities and towns along the Wasatch Front, a metropolitan region that runs north–south with the Wasatch Mountains rising on the eastern side. Growth outside the Wasatch Front is also increasing. The St. George metropolitan area is currently the second fastest-growing in the country after the Las Vegas metropolitan area, while the Heber micropolitan area is also the second fastest-growing in the country (behind Palm Coast, Florida).

Utah contains five metropolitan areas (Logan, Ogden-Clearfield, Salt Lake City, Provo-Orem, and St. George), and six micropolitan areas (Brigham City, Heber, Vernal, Price, Richfield, and Cedar City).

According to HUD's 2022 Annual Homeless Assessment Report, there were an estimated 3,557 homeless people in Utah.

Health and fertility

Utah ranks among the highest in total fertility rate, 47th in teenage pregnancy, lowest in percentage of births out of wedlock, lowest in number of abortions per capita, and lowest in percentage of teen pregnancies terminated in abortion. However, statistics relating to pregnancies and abortions may also be artificially low from teenagers going out of state for abortions because of parental notification requirements. Utah has the lowest child poverty rate in the country, despite its young demographics. According to the Gallup-Healthways Global Well-Being Index , Utahns ranked fourth in overall well-being in the United States. A 2002 national prescription drug study determined that antidepressant drugs were "prescribed in Utah more often than in any other state, at a rate nearly twice the national average". The data shows that depression rates in Utah are no higher than the national average.

Ancestry and race

The largest ancestry groups in the state are:
 26.0% English
 11.9% German
 11.8% Scandinavian (5.4% Danish, 4.0% Swedish, 2.4% Norwegian)
 9.0% Mexican
 6.6% American
 6.2% Irish
 4.6% Scottish
 2.7% Italian
 2.4% Dutch
 2.2% French
 2.2% Welsh
 1.4% Scotch Irish
 1.3% Swiss

In 2011 one-third of Utah's workforce was reported to be bilingual, developed through a program of acquisition of second languages beginning in elementary school, and related to Mormonism's missionary goals for its young people.

In 2011, 28.6% of Utah's population younger than the age of one were ethnic minorities, meaning they had at least one parent who was of a race other than non-Hispanic white.

Religion

Mormons are the largest religious group in Utah. However, the percentage of Mormons to the overall population has been decreasing. In 2017, 62.8% of Utahns were members of the LDS Church. This declined to 61.2% in 2018 and to 60.7% in 2019. Members of the LDS Church currently make up between 34%–41% of the population within Salt Lake City. However, many of the other major population centers such as Provo, Logan, Tooele, and St. George tend to be predominantly LDS, along with many suburban and rural areas. The LDS Church has the largest number of congregations, numbering 4,815 wards. According to results from the 2010 U.S. census, combined with official LDS Church membership statistics, church members represented 62.1% of Utah's total population. The Utah county with the lowest percentage of church members was Grand County, at 26.5%, while the county with the highest percentage was Morgan County, at 86.1%. In addition, the result for the most populated county, Salt Lake County, was 51.4%.

Though the LDS Church officially maintains a policy of neutrality in regard to political parties, the church's doctrine has a strong regional influence on politics. Another doctrine effect can be seen in Utah's high birth rate (25 percent higher than the national average; the highest for a state in the U.S.). The Mormons in Utah tend to have conservative views when it comes to most political issues and the majority of voter-age Utahns are unaffiliated voters (60%) who vote overwhelmingly Republican. Mitt Romney received 72.8% of the Utahn votes in 2012, while John McCain polled 62.5% in the 2008 United States presidential election and 70.9% for George W. Bush in 2004. In 2010 the Association of Religion Data Archives (ARDA) reported that the three largest denominational groups in Utah are the LDS Church with 1,910,504 adherents; the Catholic Church with 160,125 adherents, and the Southern Baptist Convention with 12,593 adherents.

According to a Gallup poll, Utah had the third-highest number of people reporting as "Very Religious" in 2015, at 55% (trailing only Mississippi and Alabama). However, it was near the national average of people reporting as "Nonreligious" (31%), and featured the smallest percentage of people reporting as "Moderately Religious" (15%) of any state, being eight points lower than second-lowest state Vermont. In addition, it had the highest average weekly church attendance of any state, at 51%.

Languages

The official language in the state of Utah is English. Utah English is primarily a merger of Northern and Midland American dialects carried west by LDS Church members, whose original New York dialect later incorporated features from northeast Ohio and central Illinois. Conspicuous in the speech of some in the central valley, although less frequent now in Salt Lake City, is a cord-card merger, so that the vowels /ɑ/ an /ɔ/ are pronounced the same before an /ɹ/, such as in the words cord and card.

In 2000, 87.5% of all state residents five years of age or older spoke only English at home, a decrease from 92.2% in 1990.

Age and gender

Utah has the highest total birth rate and accordingly, the youngest population of any U.S. state. In 2010, the state's population was 50.2% male and 49.8% female. The life expectancy is 79.3 years.

Economy

The per capita personal income was $45,700 in 2012. Major industries of Utah include: mining, cattle ranching, salt production, and government services.

According to the 2007 State New Economy Index, Utah is ranked the top state in the nation for Economic Dynamism, determined by "the degree to which state economies are knowledge-based, globalized, entrepreneurial, information technology-driven and innovation-based". In 2014, Utah was ranked number one in Forbes' list of "Best States For Business". A November 2010 article in Newsweek magazine highlighted Utah and particularly the Salt Lake City area's economic outlook, calling it "the new economic Zion", and examined how the area has been able to bring in high-paying jobs and attract high-tech corporations to the area during a recession. , the state's unemployment rate was 3.5%. In terms of "small business friendliness", in 2014 Utah emerged as number one, based on a study drawing upon data from more than 12,000 small business owners.

In eastern Utah petroleum production is a major industry. Near Salt Lake City, petroleum refining is done by a number of oil companies. In central Utah, coal production accounts for much of the mining activity.

According to Internal Revenue Service tax returns, Utahns rank first among all U.S. states in the proportion of income given to charity by the wealthy. This is due to the standard ten percent of all earnings that Mormons give to the LDS Church. According to the Corporation for National and Community Service, Utah had an average of 884,000 volunteers between 2008 and 2010, each of whom contributed 89.2 hours per volunteer. This figure equates to $3.8 billion of service contributed, ranking Utah number one for volunteerism in the nation.

Taxation

Utah collects personal income tax; since 2008 the tax has been a flat five percent for all taxpayers. The state sales tax has a base rate of 6.45 percent, with cities and counties levying additional local sales taxes that vary among the municipalities. Property taxes are assessed and collected locally. Utah does not charge intangible property taxes and does not impose an inheritance tax.

Tourism

Tourism is a major industry in Utah. With five national parks (Arches, Bryce Canyon, Canyonlands, Capitol Reef, and Zion), Utah has the third most national parks of any state after Alaska and California. In addition, Utah features eight national monuments (Cedar Breaks, Dinosaur, Grand Staircase–Escalante, Hovenweep, Natural Bridges, Bears Ears, Rainbow Bridge, and Timpanogos Cave), two national recreation areas (Flaming Gorge and Glen Canyon), seven national forests (Ashley, Caribou-Targhee, Dixie, Fishlake, Manti-La Sal, Sawtooth, and Uinta-Wasatch-Cache), and numerous state parks and monuments.

The Moab area, in the southeastern part of the state, is known for its challenging mountain biking trails, including Slickrock. Moab also hosts the famous Moab Jeep Safari semiannually.

Utah has seen an increase in tourism since the 2002 Winter Olympics. Park City is home to the United States Ski Team. Utah's ski resorts are primarily located in northern Utah near Salt Lake City, Park City, Ogden, and Provo. Between 2007 and 2011 Deer Valley in Park City, has been ranked the top ski resort in North America in a survey organized by Ski Magazine.

Utah has many significant ski resorts. The 2009 Ski Magazine reader survey concluded that six of the top ten resorts deemed most "accessible", and six of the top ten with the best snow conditions, were located in Utah. In Southern Utah, Brian Head Ski Resort is located in the mountains near Cedar City. Former Olympic venues including Utah Olympic Park and Utah Olympic Oval are still in operation for training and competition and allows the public to participate in numerous activities including ski jumping, bobsleigh, and speed skating.

Utah features many cultural attractions such as Temple Square, the Sundance Film Festival, the Red Rock Film Festival, the DOCUTAH Film Festival, the Utah Data Center, and the Utah Shakespearean Festival. Temple Square is ranked as the 16th most visited tourist attraction in the United States by Forbes magazine, with more than five million annual visitors.

Other attractions include Monument Valley, the Great Salt Lake, the Bonneville Salt Flats, and Lake Powell.

Branding

The state of Utah relies heavily on income from tourists and travelers visiting the state's parks and ski resorts, and thus the need to "brand" Utah and create an impression of the state throughout the world has led to several state slogans, the most famous of which being "The Greatest Snow on Earth", which has been in use in Utah officially since 1975 (although the slogan was in unofficial use as early as 1962) and now adorns nearly 50 percent of the state's license plates. In 2001, Utah Governor Mike Leavitt approved a new state slogan, "Utah! Where Ideas Connect", which lasted until March 10, 2006, when the Utah Travel Council and the office of Governor Jon Huntsman announced that "Life Elevated" would be the new state slogan.

Mining

Beginning in the late 19th century with the state's mining boom (including the Bingham Canyon Mine, among the world's largest open pit mines), companies attracted large numbers of immigrants with job opportunities. Since the days of the Utah Territory mining has played a major role in Utah's economy. Historical mining towns include Mercur in Tooele County, Silver Reef in Washington County, Eureka in Juab County, Park City in Summit County and numerous coal mining camps throughout Carbon County such as Castle Gate, Spring Canyon, and Hiawatha.

These settlements were characteristic of the boom and bust cycle that dominated mining towns of the American West. Park City, Utah, and Alta, Utah were boom towns in the early twentieth centuries. Rich silver mines in the mountains adjacent to the towns led to many people flocking to the towns in search of wealth. During the early part of the Cold War era, uranium was mined in eastern Utah. Today mining activity still plays a major role in the state's economy. Minerals mined in Utah include copper, gold, silver, molybdenum, zinc, lead, and beryllium. Fossil fuels including coal, petroleum, and natural gas continue to play a large role in Utah's economy, especially in the eastern part of the state in counties such as Carbon, Emery, Grand, and Uintah.

Incidents

In 2007, nine people were killed at the Crandall Canyon Mine collapse.

Energy

Utah extracts more coal and generates more electricity than it consumes.  The state has the potential to generate 31.6 TWh/year from 13.1 GW of wind power, and 10,290 TWh/year from solar power using 4,048 GW of photovoltaic (PV), including 5.6 GW of rooftop photovoltaic, and 1,638 GW of concentrated solar power. The Blue Castle Project is working toward building the state's first nuclear power plant near Green River, Utah. It is projected to be completed in 2030.

Transportation

Road

I-15 and I-80 are the main interstate highways in the state, where they intersect and briefly merge near downtown Salt Lake City. I-15 traverses the state north-to-south, entering from Arizona near St. George, paralleling the Wasatch Front, and crossing into Idaho near Portage. I-80 spans northern Utah east-to-west, entering from Nevada at Wendover, crossing the Wasatch Mountains east of Salt Lake City, and entering Wyoming near Evanston. I-84 West enters from Idaho near Snowville (from Boise) and merges with I-15 from Tremonton to Ogden, then heads southeast through the Wasatch Mountains before terminating at I-80 near Echo Junction.

I-70 splits from I-15 at Cove Fort in central Utah and heads east through mountains and rugged desert terrain, providing quick access to the many national parks and national monuments of southern Utah, and has been noted for its beauty. The  stretch from Salina to Green River is the country's longest stretch of interstate without services and, when completed in 1970, was the longest stretch of entirely new highway constructed in the U.S. since the Alaska Highway was completed in 1943.

Rail and transit

Utah's Class I freight railroads are the BNSF Railway and the Union Pacific Railway. The state was previously served by Amtrak's Pioneer and Desert Wind trains. Heritage railroads include the Heber Valley Railroad and the Wild Kingdom Train.

The Utah Transit Authority (UTA) operates public transport services throughout the Wasatch Front region. TRAX, the UTA's light rail system, consists of three lines. The Blue Line (formerly Salt Lake/Sandy Line) begins in the suburb of Draper and ends in Downtown Salt Lake City. The Red Line (Mid-Jordan/University Line) begins in the Daybreak Community of South Jordan, a southwestern valley suburb, and ends at the University of Utah. The Green Line begins in West Valley City, passes through downtown Salt Lake City, and ends at Salt Lake City International Airport. The UTA also operates FrontRunner, a commuter rail line running between Ogden and Provo via Salt Lake City.

The UTA's bus system stretches from the Salt Lake Valley west to Grantsville and east to Park City. Beyond UTA, the cities of Cedar City, Logan, Park City, and St. George are served by local bus operators. In the winter, the UTA and several private bus companies operate shuttle routes to Utah's ski resorts.

Air

Salt Lake City International Airport is the only international airport in the state and serves as a hub for Delta Air Lines. The airport has consistently ranked first in on-time departures and had the fewest cancellations among U.S. airports. The airport has non-stop service to more than a hundred destinations throughout the United States, Canada, and Mexico, as well as to Amsterdam, London and Paris. Canyonlands Field (near Moab), Cedar City Regional Airport, Ogden-Hinckley Airport, Provo Municipal Airport, St. George Regional Airport, and Vernal Regional Airport all provide limited commercial air service. A new regional airport at St. George opened on January 12, 2011. SkyWest Airlines is also headquartered in St. George and maintains a hub at Salt Lake City.

Law and government

Utah government is divided into three branches: executive, legislative, and judicial. The current governor of Utah is Spencer Cox, who was sworn in on January 4, 2021. The governor is elected for a four-year term. The Utah State Legislature consists of a Senate and a House of Representatives. State senators serve four-year terms and representatives two-year terms. The Utah Legislature meets each year in January for an annual 45-day session.

The Utah Supreme Court is the court of last resort in Utah. It consists of five justices, who are appointed by the governor, and then subject to retention election. The Utah Court of Appeals handles cases from the trial courts. Trial level courts are the district courts and justice courts. All justices and judges, like those on the Utah Supreme Court, are subject to retention election after appointment.

In a 2020 study, Utah was ranked as the 3rd easiest state for citizens to vote in.

Counties

Utah is divided into political jurisdictions designated as counties.

 Total Counties: 29
 Total 2020 population: 3,271,616
Total state area:

Women's rights

Utah granted full voting rights to women in 1870, 26 years before becoming a state. Among all U.S. states, only Wyoming granted suffrage to women earlier. However, in 1887 the initial Edmunds-Tucker Act was passed by Congress in an effort to curtail Mormon influence in the territorial government. One of the provisions of the Act was the repeal of women's suffrage; full suffrage was not returned until Utah was admitted to the Union in 1896.

Utah is one of the 15 states that have not ratified the U.S. Equal Rights Amendment.

Free-range parenting

In March 2018, Utah passed the United States' first "free-range parenting" bill. The bill was signed into law by Republican Governor Gary Herbert and states that parents who allow their children to engage in certain activities without supervision are not considered neglectful.

Constitution

The constitution of Utah was enacted May 8, 1895. Notably, the constitution outlawed polygamy, as requested by Congress when Utah had applied for statehood, and reestablished the territorial practice of women's suffrage. Utah's Constitution has been amended many times since its inception.

Alcohol, tobacco and gambling laws

Utah's laws in regard to alcohol, tobacco and gambling are strict. Utah is an alcoholic beverage control state. The Utah Department of Alcoholic Beverage Control regulates the sale of alcohol; wine and spirituous liquors may be purchased only at state liquor stores, and local laws may prohibit the sale of beer and other alcoholic beverages on Sundays. The state bans the sale of fruity alcoholic drinks at grocery stores and convenience stores. The law states that such drinks must now have new state-approved labels on the front of the products that contain capitalized letters in bold type telling consumers the drinks contain alcohol and at what percentage. Utah is the only state that imposes a maxium blood alcohol content (BAC) of 0.05% for drivers, as opposed to the 0.08% limit in other states. The Utah Indoor Clean Air Act is a statewide smoking ban that prohibits it in many public places. Utah and Hawaii are the only two states in the United States to outlaw all forms of gambling.

Same-sex marriage

Same-sex marriage became legal in Utah on December 20, 2013, when U.S. District Court Judge Robert J. Shelby  issued a ruling in Kitchen v. Herbert. As of close of business December 26, more than 1,225 marriage licenses were issued, with at least 74 percent, or 905 licenses, issued to gay and lesbian couples. The Utah Attorney General's office was granted a stay of the ruling by the U.S. Supreme Court on January 6, 2014, while the Tenth Circuit Court of Appeals considered the case. On October 6, 2014, the U.S. Supreme Court declined a writ of certiorari, and the 10th Circuit Court issued their mandate later that day, lifting their stay. Same-sex marriages commenced again in Utah that day.

Politics

In the late 19th century, the federal government took issue with polygamy in the LDS Church. The LDS Church discontinued plural marriage in 1890, and in 1896 Utah gained admission to the Union. Many new people settled the area soon after the Mormon pioneers. Relations have often been strained between the LDS population and the non-LDS population. These tensions have played a large part in Utah's history (Liberal Party vs. People's Party).

Utah votes predominantly Republican. Self-identified Latter-day Saints are more likely to vote for the Republican ticket than non-Mormons. Utah is one of the most Republican states in the nation. Utah was the single most Republican-leaning state in the country in every presidential election from 1976 to 2004, measured by the percentage point margin between the Republican and Democratic candidates. In 2008 Utah was only the third-most Republican state (after Wyoming and Oklahoma), but in 2012, with Mormon Mitt Romney atop the Republican ticket, Utah returned to its position as the most Republican state. However, the 2016 presidential election result saw Republican Donald Trump carry the state (marking the thirteenth consecutive win by the Republican presidential candidate) with only a plurality, the first time this happened since 1992.

Both of Utah's U.S. Senators, Mitt Romney and Mike Lee, are Republican. Three more Republicans—Rob Bishop, Chris Stewart, and John Curtis—represent Utah in the United States House of Representatives. Ben McAdams was the sole Democratic member of the Utah delegation, representing the 4th congressional district, based in Salt Lake City, from 2019 to 2021, though he lost re-election to Burgess Owens, a Republican, in 2020. After Jon Huntsman Jr. resigned to serve as U.S. Ambassador to China in 2009, Gary Herbert was sworn in as governor on August 11, 2009. Herbert was elected to serve out the remainder of the term in a special election in 2010, defeating Democratic nominee Salt Lake County Mayor Peter Corroon with 64% of the vote. He won election to a full four-year term in 2012, defeating the Democrat Peter Cooke with 68% of the vote.

The LDS Church maintains an official policy of neutrality with regard to political parties and candidates.

In the 1970s, then-Apostle Ezra Taft Benson was quoted by the Associated Press that it would be difficult for a faithful Latter-day Saint to be a liberal Democrat. Although the LDS Church has officially repudiated such statements on many occasions, Democratic candidates—including LDS Democrats—believe Republicans capitalize on the perception that the Republican Party is doctrinally superior. Political scientist and pollster Dan Jones explains this disparity by noting that the national Democratic Party is associated with liberal positions on gay marriage and abortion, both of which the LDS Church is against. The Republican Party in heavily Mormon Utah County presents itself as the superior choice for Latter-day Saints. Even though Utah Democratic candidates are predominantly LDS, socially conservative, and pro-life, no Democrat has won in Utah County since 1994.

David Magleby, dean of Social and Behavioral Sciences at Brigham Young University, a lifelong Democrat and a political analyst, asserts that the Republican Party actually has more conservative positions than the LDS Church. Magleby argues that the locally conservative Democrats are in better accord with LDS doctrine. For example, the Republican Party of Utah opposes almost all abortions while Utah Democrats take a more liberal approach, although more conservative than their national counterparts. On Second Amendment issues, the state GOP has been at odds with the LDS Church position opposing concealed firearms in places of worship and in public spaces.

In 1998 the church expressed concern that Utahns perceived the Republican Party as an LDS institution and authorized lifelong Democrat and Seventy Marlin Jensen to promote LDS bipartisanship.

Utah is much more conservative than the United States as a whole, primarily on social issues. Compared to other Republican-dominated states in the Mountain West such as Idaho and Wyoming, Utah politics have a more moralistic and less libertarian character, according to David Magleby.

About 80% of Utah's Legislature are members of The Church of Jesus Christ of Latter-day Saints, while members account for 61 percent of the population. Since becoming a state in 1896, Utah has had only two non-Mormon governors.

In 2006, the legislature passed legislation aimed at banning joint-custody for a non-biological parent of a child. The custody measure passed the legislature and was vetoed by the governor, a reciprocal benefits supporter.

Carbon County's Democrats are generally made up of members of the large Greek, Italian, and Southeastern European communities, whose ancestors migrated in the early 20th century to work in the extensive mining industry. The views common amongst this group are heavily influenced by labor politics, particularly of the New Deal Era.

The state's most Republican areas tend to be Utah County, which is the home to Brigham Young University in the city of Provo, and nearly all the rural counties. These areas generally hold socially conservative views in line with that of the national Religious Right. The most Democratic areas of the state lie currently in and around Salt Lake City proper.

The state has not voted for a Democrat for president since 1964. Historically, Republican presidential nominees score one of their best margins of victory here. Utah was the Republicans' best state in the 1976, 1980, 1984, 1988, 1996, 2000, 2004 and 2012 elections. In 1992, Utah was the only state in the nation where Democratic candidate Bill Clinton finished behind both Republican candidate George HW Bush and Independent candidate Ross Perot. In 2004, Republican George W. Bush won every county in the state and Utah gave him his largest margin of victory of any state. He won the state's five electoral votes by a margin of 46 percentage points with 71.5% of the vote. In the 1996 Presidential elections the Republican candidate received a smaller 54% of the vote while the Democrat earned 34%.

In 2020, the Associated Press wrote a piece profiling Utah's political culture during that year's presidential election. The article noted a more bipartisan and cooperative environment, along with conservative support of liberal causes such as LGBT rights and marijuana use, despite the Republican dominance in the state and the political polarization seen in other parts of the U.S. at the time.

Major cities and towns

Utah's population is concentrated in two areas, the Wasatch Front in the north-central part of the state, with over 2.6 million residents; and Washington County, in southwestern Utah, locally known as "Dixie", with more than 175,000 residents in the metropolitan area.

According to the 2010 census, Utah was the second fastest-growing state (at 23.8 percent) in the United States between 2000 and 2010 (behind Nevada). St. George, in the southwest, is the second fastest-growing metropolitan area in the United States, trailing Greeley, Colorado.

The three fastest-growing counties from 2000 to 2010 were Wasatch County (54.7%), Washington County (52.9%), and Tooele County (42.9%). However, Utah County added the most people (148,028). Between 2000 and 2010, Saratoga Springs (1,673%), Herriman (1,330%), Eagle Mountain (893%), Cedar Hills (217%), South Willard (168%), Nibley (166%), Syracuse (159%), West Haven (158%), Lehi (149%), Washington (129%), and Stansbury Park (116%) all at least doubled in population. West Jordan (35,376), Lehi (28,379), St. George (23,234), South Jordan (20,981), West Valley City (20,584), and Herriman (20,262) all added at least 20,000 people.

 Until 2003, the Salt Lake City and Ogden-Clearfield metropolitan areas were considered as a single metropolitan area.

Colleges and universities

 Bridgerland Technical College in Logan
 Broadview College in West Jordan
 Brigham Young University in Provo (satellite campus in Salt Lake City)
 Davis Technical College in Kaysville
 Eagle Gate College in Murray and Layton
 Ensign College (formerly LDS Business College) in Salt Lake City
 Joyce University of Nursing and Health Sciences (formerly Ameritech College of Healthcare) in Draper
 Mountainland Technical College in Lehi
 Neumont College of Computer Science in South Jordan
 Noorda College of Osteopathic Medicine in Provo
 Ogden–Weber Technical College in Ogden
 Provo College in Provo
 Rocky Mountain University of Health Professions in Provo
 Roseman University in South Jordan, Utah
 Salt Lake Community College in Taylorsville
 Snow College in Ephraim and Richfield
 Southern Utah University in Cedar City
 Southwest Technical College in Cedar City
 Tooele Technical College in Tooele
 Uintah Basin Technical College in Roosevelt
 University of Phoenix at various locations statewide
 University of Utah in Salt Lake City
 Utah State University in Logan (satellite campuses at various state locations)
 Utah State University Eastern in Price
 Utah Tech University in St. George (formerly Dixie State University) as of May 2022, and legal effect in July 2022.)
 Utah Valley University in Orem
 Weber State University in Ogden
 Western Governors University an online only university, headquartered in Salt Lake City
 Westminster College in Salt Lake City

Culture

Sports

Utah is the second-least populous U.S. state to have a major professional sports league franchise, after the Vegas Golden Knights joined the National Hockey League in 2017. The Utah Jazz of the National Basketball Association play at Vivint Arena in Salt Lake City. The team moved to the city from New Orleans in 1979 and has been one of the most consistently successful teams in the league (although they have yet to win a championship). Salt Lake City was previously host to the Utah Stars, who competed in the ABA from 1970 to 1976 and won one championship, and to the Utah Starzz of the WNBA from 1997 to 2003.

Real Salt Lake of Major League Soccer was founded in 2005 and play their home matches at Rio Tinto Stadium (now known as America First Field in Sandy. RSL remains the only Utah major league sports team to have won a national championship, having won the MLS Cup in 2009. RSL currently operates three adult teams in addition to the MLS side. Real Monarchs, competing in the third-tier MLS Next Pro, is the official reserve side for RSL. The team began play in the 2015 season at Rio Tinto Stadium, remaining there until moving to Zions Bank Stadium, located at RSL's training center in Herriman, for the 2018 season and beyond. Utah Royals FC, which shares ownership with RSL and also plays at America First Field, has played in the National Women's Soccer League, the top level of U.S. women's soccer, since 2018. Before the creation of the Royals, RSL's main women's side had been Real Salt Lake Women, which began play in the Women's Premier Soccer League in 2008 and moved to United Women's Soccer in 2016. RSL Women currently play at Utah Valley University in Orem.

Utah's highest level Minor League Baseball team is the Triple-A Salt Lake Bees, who play at Smith's Ballpark in Salt Lake City as a part of the Pacific Coast League. Utah also has one minor league hockey team, the Utah Grizzlies, who play at the Maverik Center and compete in the ECHL.

Utah has seven universities that compete in Division I of the NCAA. Three of the schools have football programs that participate in the top-level Football Bowl Subdivision: Utah in the Pac-12 Conference, Utah State in the Mountain West Conference, and BYU  as an independent (although BYU competes in the non-football West Coast Conference for most other sports). In addition, Weber State and Southern Utah (SUU) compete in the Big Sky Conference of the FCS. Utah Tech, with an FCS football program, and Utah Valley, with no football program, are members of the Western Athletic Conference (WAC).

Salt Lake City hosted the 2002 Winter Olympics. After early financial struggles and scandal, the 2002 Olympics eventually became among the most successful Winter Olympics in history from a marketing and financial standpoint. Watched by more than two billion viewers, the Games ended up with a profit of $100 million.

Utah has hosted professional golf tournaments such as the Uniting Fore Care Classic and currently the Utah Championship.

Rugby has been growing quickly in the state of Utah, growing from 17 teams in 2009 to 70  with more than 3,000 players, and more than 55 high school varsity teams. The growth has been inspired in part by the 2008 movie Forever Strong. Utah fields two of the most competitive teams in the nation in college rugby—BYU and Utah. BYU has won the National Championship in 2009, 2012, 2013, 2014, and 2015. Formed in 2017, the Utah Warriors are a Major League Rugby team based in Salt Lake City.

Entertainment

Utah is the setting of or the filming location for many books, films, television series, music videos, and video games.

Utah's capitol Salt Lake City is the final location in the video game The Last of Us.

See also

 Index of Utah-related articles
 Outline of Utah

Notes

References

Further reading

 Brown, Adam R. Utah politics and government: American democracy among a unique electorate (U of Nebraska Press, 2018).
 Ching, Jacqueline. Utah: Past and Present (Rosen, 2010).
 May, Dean L. Utah: A people's history (U of Utah Press, 1987).
 Peterson, Charles S. and Brian Q. Cannon. The Awkward State of Utah: Coming of Age in the Nation, 1896–1945. Salt Lake City: University of Utah Press, 2015.

External links

General

Government

Military

Maps and demographics
 
 
 .

Tourism and recreation
 Utah Office of Tourism Official Website  
 Office of Tourism (requires Adobe Flash)
 Utah State Parks
 Utah Traffic and Road Conditions

Other
 Utah State Chamber of Commerce

 
Former Spanish colonies
States and territories established in 1896
States of the United States
Western United States
1896 establishments in the United States
Contiguous United States